Fidel Luña (23 March 1921 – 2 January 1966) was a Mexican fencer. He was born in Altotonga, Veracruz.

He competed in the individual and team sabre events at the 1948 Summer Olympics.

He died in a car accident on the Autopista Verdadera, near Cuernavaca.

References

External links
 

1921 births
1966 deaths
Mexican male sabre fencers
Olympic fencers of Mexico
Fencers at the 1948 Summer Olympics